The 2007 Belgian Grand Prix (officially the 2007 Formula 1 ING Belgian Grand Prix) was the fourteenth race of the 2007 FIA Formula One World Championship, returning to the Formula One calendar after a year's absence. It was held on 16 September at the Circuit de Spa-Francorchamps, near the village of Francorchamps, Wallonia, Belgium.

Report

Background 
Going into the race, McLaren driver Lewis Hamilton led the Drivers' Championship by three points from teammate Fernando Alonso and Scuderia Ferrari led the Constructors' Championship by 57 points from BMW Sauber after the exclusion of McLaren from the Constructors' Championship following the Ferrari/McLaren spy saga. Otherwise McLaren would have been leading the Championship.

The race also marked the 100th race start for Australian Red Bull Racing driver Mark Webber.

Practice
Ferrari tried the new for the first time traffic light system.

Qualifying
The usual drivers were eliminated in the first qualifying session—Adrian Sutil and Sakon Yamamoto went out in the Spykers along with Takuma Sato and Anthony Davidson in the Super Aguris, Rubens Barrichello in the Honda and Sebastian Vettel in the Toro Rosso.

The second qualifying session was unusual as six drivers in six different cars were eliminated—Alexander Wurz of Williams, Vitantonio Liuzzi of Toro Rosso, Jenson Button of Honda, David Coulthard of Red Bull Racing. Giancarlo Fisichella of Renault and Ralf Schumacher of Toyota. Fisichella was later relegated right to the back of the grid after changing his engine after qualifying.

This left seven different teams in the top 10. Heikki Kovalainen qualified tenth for Renault, just behind Jarno Trulli in the Toyota. Ahead of them were Mark Webber's Red Bull and Nick Heidfeld in the BMW Sauber. Nico Rosberg did very well in the Williams to qualify on row 3 alongside Robert Kubica in the second BMW Sauber. However, the Pole was given a ten place grid drop for an engine change. Once again, McLaren and Ferrari occupied the top four places. Fernando Alonso pipped McLaren teammate Lewis Hamilton to 3rd place, but Ferrari dominated, with Kimi Räikkönen beating Felipe Massa to get his 14th career pole and lock out the front row for the Italian team.

Due to FIA rules about the order in which penalties are applied, Kubica's penalty was applied first. This left him 15th and behind Fisichella. Then the Italian's penalty was applied, so Kubica ended up 14th. This meant Coulthard, Button and Liuzzi all gained two places as both drivers had been ahead of them.

Race
The order from the start remained fairly unchanged with the Ferraris of Kimi Räikkönen and Felipe Massa led away from Fernando Alonso and Lewis Hamilton, although there was a lot of pushing between the McLarens as Hamilton attempted to pass around the outside of turn one, but Alonso pushed him wide onto the tarmac on the outside of the corner.

Giancarlo Fisichella's Renault suffered a suspension failure on lap 2, making him the first retirement of the race. He had been running last. Also on lap 2, Alexander Wurz spun in the Williams, slipping to the back of the field.

Sebastian Vettel soon suffered a handling problem, probably caused by a collision, which eliminated his Toro Rosso from the race on lap 9.

Massa briefly took the lead on lap 16, but Räikkönen reclaimed it a lap later after his pitstop.

David Coulthard suffered a hydraulic failure in his Red Bull on lap 30. He was quickly followed with a fuel pressure problem for Wurz, who was still last, on lap 35, and the Honda of Jenson Button, which dropped out on lap 37 with another hydraulic failure.

Massa once again led for just one lap during Räikkönen's second stop, but he retook it the following lap.

Räikkönen finally came home to win from Massa, clinching the World Constructors Championship for Ferrari. Alonso, Hamilton, Nick Heidfeld in the BMW Sauber, Nico Rosberg's Williams, Mark Webber in the Red Bull and Heikki Kovalainen's Renault rounded up the top eight. The only changes from the starting top eight were Heidfeld and Rosberg swapping places and Kovalainen passing Jarno Trulli's Toyota to take eighth.

The race was overshadowed by the death of former World Rally Champion Colin McRae in a helicopter crash during Saturday's qualifying.

Classification

Qualifying

Notes

 – Robert Kubica dropped ten places for engine change. 
 – Giancarlo Fisichella started at the back of the grid for an engine change after qualifying.
 – Giancarlo Fisichella "...elected to start from the pits with a lower-downforce set-up to try and enhance his chance of making up places."
 – Anthony Davidson "...started from the pit lane after experiencing a front-end problem on the grid out-lap."

Race

Championship standings after the race 

Drivers' Championship standings

Constructors' Championship standings

Note: Only the top five positions are included for both sets of standings.
 Bold text indicates competitors who still had a theoretical chance of becoming World Champion.

See also 
 2007 Spa-Francorchamps GP2 Series round

References

External links

Detailed Belgian Grand Prix results

Belgian Grand Prix
Belgian Grand Prix
Grand Prix
September 2007 sports events in Europe